Hans Swarowsky (September 16, 1899September 10, 1975) was an Austrian conductor of Hungarian birth.
 
Swarowsky was born in Budapest, Hungary. He studied the art of conducting under Felix Weingartner and Richard Strauss. His teachers in musical theory included Arnold Schoenberg and Anton Webern.

Herbert von Karajan invited him to take on the permanent position as conductor of the Vienna State Opera.

He became a professor of conducting at the Vienna Music Academy. His many conducting students included Claudio Abbado, Mariss Jansons, Alexis Hauser, Alexander Alexeev, Zubin Mehta, Leonid Nikolaev, Paul Angerer, Ádám and  Iván Fischer, Avi Ostrowsky Jesús López-Cobos, Gustav Meier, Miltiades Caridis, Aleksandr Alekseyev, Giuseppe Sinopoli, Gianluigi Gelmetti, Brian Jackson, Alfred Prinz, Bryan Fairfax, James Allen Gähres, Albert Rosen and Bruno Weil. Otmar Suitner was Hans Swarowsky's successor at the Vienna Music Academy. Swarowsky's lectures and essays were collected into the publication Wahrung der Gestalt (Keeping Shape), which today serves as an encyclopaedia for performance and conducting.
From 1957 to 1959 he was chief conductor of the Scottish National Orchestra (now the Royal Scottish N.O.).

He died in Salzburg, Austria, less than a week before his 76th birthday.

Selected recordings 
For the Official Discography browse here.

Camille Saint-Saëns: Piano concerto n°2 and Piano concerto n°5, Orazio Frugoni (piano), Pro Musica Ochestra Vienna. LP Vox PL-8410 (rec.1954)

Felix Mendelssohn: Violin Concerto, Ivry Gitlis (violin), Pro Musica Ochestra Vienna. LP Vox PL-8840 (rec.1954)

References

External links 

 
 
 Hans Swarowsky at the Bach Cantatas Website
 
 Essay by Christopher Howell on Hans Swarowsky's life and recordings at the MusicWeb International Website

Male conductors (music)
Hungarian conductors (music)
Hungarian male musicians
Austrian music educators
Hungarian music educators
Austrian people of Hungarian descent
Hungarian Jews
Musicians from Budapest
1899 births
1975 deaths
20th-century Austrian conductors (music)
20th-century Austrian male musicians